The 1920 Detroit Titans football team represented the University of Detroit as an independent during the 1920 college football season. Detroit shut out six of ten opponents, outscored all opponents by a combined total of 279 to 32, and finished with an 8–2 record in their third year under head coach James F. Duffy.

Two Detroit players, Tillie Voss and Dutch Lauer, went on to play in the National Football League. End Frank Kane was the team captain.

Schedule

References

External links
 1920 University of Detroit football programs

Detroit
Detroit Titans football seasons
Detroit Titans football
Detroit Titans football